(Ariadne and Bacchus) is an opera by Marin Marais first performed at the Académie Royale de Musique (the Paris Opera) on 8 March 1696.  It takes the form of a tragédie en musique in five acts and a prologue. The libretto by Saint-Jean is based on Ovid's Metamorphoses and deals with the legend of Ariadne.

Sources
  Félix Clément and Pierre Larousse Dictionnaire des Opéras, Paris, 1881

French-language operas
Tragédies en musique
Operas by Marin Marais
1696 operas
Operas
Opera world premieres at the Paris Opera
Operas based on Metamorphoses
Ariadne